The 2014 Kentucky Wildcats football team represented the University of Kentucky in the 2014 NCAA Division I FBS football season. The Wildcats competed as a member of the Southeastern Conference (SEC) as part of its Eastern Division. The team was led by head coach Mark Stoops, in his second year, and played its home games at Commonwealth Stadium in Lexington, Kentucky. The team started 5-1, but lost their final six games and finished the season 5–7, 2–6 in SEC play, and sixth place in the Eastern Division.

Pre-season

Schedule changes for 2014
Three of UK's annual opponents – Louisville, Tennessee, and Vanderbilt – will be played at different points in the schedule beginning in 2014. 
As requested by the SEC and the ACC, the Kentucky vs. Louisville game will be moved to the final game of the regular season on an annual basis. The leagues moved the game as a result of adjustments in scheduling brought on by the conference expansions undertaken in both the SEC and ACC. The switch of the Kentucky-Louisville game date means that there will be four SEC vs. ACC in-state rivalry matchups on the final weekend of the season. The Florida-Florida State, Georgia-Georgia Tech and South Carolina-Clemson tilts also are on that weekend.
The UK vs. UofL game had been played early in the schedule since the series was renewed in 1994. For Kentucky, moving the game to the end of the regular season also will require another adjustment. Tennessee has been scheduled as the Wildcats' final foe since 1953 and the Volunteers will now move to November 15, 2014, meaning that UK will close the regular season with a pair of rivalry games.
One other significant timing change comes with the Vanderbilt game. Having played VU in November every season since 1953, the Wildcats hosted the Commodores on September 27, 2014.

Commonwealth Stadium renovations
Construction has begun on the $120 million renovation of Commonwealth Stadium, a project that features a new look for the exterior of the stadium, wider and redesigned concourses, new concession stands and rest rooms, new suites and other premium seating, a recruiting room and a new press box.
It is a two-year project but there should be minimal disruption for the 2014 season. Part of the southside upper deck has been removed in order to begin the new suite/press box complex and there will be some utility and other site preparation work done this year. Seating capacity for the stadium will be 62,093 for the 2014 campaign.
The majority of the construction will begin immediately after the last home game on Nov. 8. The reworked stadium is expected to be complete in time for the 2015 season.
Meanwhile, UK also has begun planning for a $45 million football office/practice complex that will be built on the south end of the existing Nutter Field House. Construction of that facility is expected to commence following the season, with completion targeted for 2016.

2014 signing class

2015 commitments

Personnel

Roster and staff

Depth chart
As of 9/1 for UT-Martin game

Schedule

Schedule Source:

Game summaries

Tennessee-Martin

Sources:

Braylon Heard's first-half touchdown runs of 73 and 43 yards spurred Kentucky to a season-opening, 59–14 rout of Tennessee–Martin on Saturday.

Quarterback Patrick Towles added a TD passing and running in his first career start for Kentucky, which outgained the Skyhawks 656–398. The Wildcats' sophomore threw for 370 yards, but Kentucky's tailbacks set the tone by flying through huge holes and scoring virtually untouched.

The Wildcats' improved grasp of the Air Raid offense was supposed to be displayed through the air behind Towles, who won a three-man competition for the starting job. He definitely did his part in completing 20 of 29 attempts without an interception, but the backfield rushed for 234 yards and ended up showing the scheme's big-play potential.

Heard demonstrated that on both TDs, blazing through big holes on consecutive drives to put Kentucky up 21–0 and keep the air raid sirens blaring.

Towles wasn't fazed about his tailbacks stealing the spotlight because of how well he managed the offense. The Kentucky native made good reads, avoided sacks by getting rid of the ball quickly and most importantly, showed that he could quickly hit short and long throws.

In between completions that moved the ball downfield, Towles hit several long ones to set up Kentucky scores. The first, a 44-yarder down the middle to Javess Blue, resulted in Kemp's 2-yard touchdown run soon after.

Towles followed with a 56-yard completion to Ryan Timmons to UTM's 39, a play that led to his 29-yard TD pass to freshman Blake Bone, who found a hole in the flat and then space en route to the end zone and a 28–0 lead.

Horton's 18-yard TD run came two plays after Towles' 36-yarder to Bone on the left sideline.

Ohio

Sources:

Kentucky quarterback Patrick Towles threw for 170 yards and rushed for 59 more to lead the Wildcats to a 20-3 win over Ohio Saturday.

Towles completed 17 of 31 passes and one touchdown and led the Wildcats to their first 2-0 start since 2011. Although Kentucky's offense wasn't as explosive as last week's 59-14 rout of Tennessee Martin, it was enough to help the Wildcats avenge a 28-16 loss to the Bobcats in 2004.

Kentucky was without starting running back Braylon Heard who sat out because of a sprained ankle. Heard, a junior transfer from Nebraska, rushed for 116 yards and two touchdowns in the team's opener last week.

Jojo Kemp and freshman Boom Williams split time in the backfield in Heard's absence. Williams led the Wildcats with 60 yards rushing on five carries, including a 53-yard touchdown run with 8:24 remaining in the first quarter.

Towles had six rushes of 10 yards or more on 22 attempts, including a 16-yard jaunt in the second quarter. Towles made successful completions to four different receivers, with sophomore receiver Ryan Timmons catching 10 passes for 95 yards, both career highs.

Dorian Baker had two catches for 41 yards, including an 8-yard touchdown reception to open Kentucky's scoring with 3:33 remaining in the first quarter.

After two straight scoring drives to open the contest, Kentucky's offense managed just three points on its final four possessions of the first half. Towles completed 10 of 17 passes for 131 yards and one touchdown in the first two quarters. He added 46 yards on 13 carries.

Florida

Sources:

Florida (2-0, 1-0 SEC) was an 18-point favorite in the game, no surprise given how lopsided the series has been. The Gators haven't lost to Kentucky (2-1, 0-1) since 1986 and haven't lost a game against the Wildcats at Florida Field since 1979.

The streak looked to be in jeopardy several times late in the SEC opener for both teams.

Matt Jones' 1-yard plunge in triple overtime gave Florida a 36-30 victory over Kentucky on Saturday night, extending the Gators' winning streak in the Southeastern Conference series to 28 games.

Kentucky's Austin MacGinnis, who hit a 51-yarder to tie the game late in the fourth quarter, missed a 41-yarder to start the third extra frame.

The play of the game was Florida's fourth-and-7 conversion in the first overtime. Jeff Driskel floated a ball to the back corner of the end zone and found Demarcus Robinson for a 9-yard score.

Robinson finished with 15 receptions for 216 yards and two scores. He tied Carlos Alvarez's school record for catches in a single game. No other Florida receiver caught more than two passes. Driskel completed 25 of 43 passes for 295 yards, with three touchdowns and an interception.

On Kentucky's first play of overtime, Stanley Williams reversed field, outran several tackles and scored from 25 yards out. The Gators struggled to answer, but eventually did on the fourth-down play.

The teams exchanged field goals in the second overtime. Florida could have found the end zone, but Driskel was late delivering the ball to Robinson near the front pylon.

Frankie Velez hit from 20-yard out to send it to the third extra frame.

Velez missed from 39 yards out in the fourth quarter that would have given Florida a little breathing room.

Austin Hardin, Florida's stronger-legged kicker, had a chance to win it regulation. But he pushed his 52-yarder wide right.

Florida trailed twice in the third quarter, falling behind 10-6 and then 17-13 on touchdown passes from Patrick Towles to Garrett Johnson.

Towles picked apart Florida's inexperienced secondary, throwing for 369 yards and three touchdowns. Johnson was his top target, finishing with six catches for 154 yards. He burned the Gators for a 60-yard touchdown, and then added a 33-yard score on the next drive.

Vanderbilt

Sources:

Patrick Towles threw a 20-yard touchdown pass and scored on a 1-yard run, and Kentucky made three fourth-quarter interceptions to hold off Vanderbilt 17-7 on Saturday to end a 17-game Southeastern Conference losing streak.

Though the Wildcats (3-1, 1-1) sent 56,940 away happy with their first conference win since November 2011 against Tennessee, there was no wild on-field celebration by Kentucky players after escaping the Commodores (1-4, 0-3). Coach Mark Stoops congratulated several players and shook hands with Vanderbilt coach Derek Mason before departing to cheers.

All of the game's scoring came in the first half with Towles doing the work with his arm and feet. He connected with Ryan Timmons to cap a 99-yard, 13-play opening drive, then followed Austin MacGinnis' 44-yard field goal with a 1-yard sneak just before halftime.

Kentucky's defense, particularly defensive back Marcus McWilson, A.J. Stamps and Ashely Lowery, kept the Commodores from scoring again with timely pickoffs. The Wildcats held the Commodores to just 57 second-half yards and 139 total, the fewest total yards Kentucky has given up to an SEC opponent since Vanderbilt had 91 in 1996.

Towles completed 23 of 30 passes for 201 of Kentucky's 384 yards but lost a fourth-quarter fumble and had a second-quarter interception returned 13 yards by Darrius Sims for Vanderbilt's only points. He was also sacked four times.

Despite Kentucky's inconsistent performance, the victory still was an encouraging step forward for a program seeking respectability after consecutive 2-10 seasons. Most important was finally closing the deal on an opponent for the first time in over two years, a goal the Wildcats came up just short on with a 36-30 triple-overtime loss at Florida two weeks ago.

That disappointing yet thrilling loss stirred its fan base enough to gobble up discounted upper-deck tickets and give Kentucky its biggest crowd this season.

The Wildcats were even 17-point favorites against a Vanderbilt squad that had won the last three games in this series by a 100-14 margin. Though Kentucky didn't cover the spread, being favored spoke volumes about its improvement.

In fact, Kentucky's main concern was avoiding a letdown from the Florida game, especially coming off a bye. The Wildcats showed no effects from that disappointment or the break on their first drive as they drove 99 yards in 13 plays behind Towles' arm and feet.

Besides hitting his first nine passes for 77 yards, including the slant to Timmons for the TD, the sophomore extended the drive with a 21-yard keeper on third-and-11.

Towles completed another short pass before the costly interception to Sims, whose two kickoff returns for touchdowns last week against South Carolina resulted in preventive measures by Kentucky's special teams.

Towles recovered to lead Kentucky to 10 unanswered points by intermission but Kentucky didn't score again.

South Carolina

Sources:

A late interception returned for a touchdown led the Kentucky football team to its biggest win of the Mark Stoops era with a 45-38 victory over South Carolina Saturday night at Commonwealth Stadium.

In front of 62,135, Patrick Towles threw for 208 yards and a touchdown and Jojo Kemp had 131 yards rushing and three scores - most of them out of the Wildcat formation - to lead the Wildcats to their second consecutive Southeastern Conference victory. Kentucky improved to 4-1 and 2-1 in league play, while South Carolina fell to 3-3 and 2-2 in the SEC.

UK has two conference wins for the first time since 2011, and won back-to-back SEC contests for the first time since 2006 when the Wildcats won three consecutive league outings.

Kentucky found itself down by two scores twice, but continued to battle back. It was the second time, early in the fourth quarter, having given up 21 unanswered points that was the game changer.

UK's offense found the end zone on consecutive drives following USC's final score, both Kemp touchdown runs, to tie the game at 38-38.

It was on South Carolina's possession after Kentucky tied the game that the UK defense made its biggest statement yet. With the Gamecocks on their own 20-yard line, Alvin "Bud" Dupree intercepted a tipped pass on the six-yard line. The senior went untouched into the end zone for the game-winning touchdown. UK's first interception returned for a score since 2009 gave the Wildcats a 45-38 lead with 2:29 left.

Louisiana-Monroe

Sources:

Led by a strong defensive effort that included two interceptions returned for touchdowns, the Kentucky football team scored 45 unanswered points to defeat ULM, 48-14 Saturday afternoon in front of 56,676 fans on a crisp fall day at Commonwealth Stadium.

With the win, the Wildcats improved to 5-1 while the Warhawks fell to 3-3. UK, 5-1 for the first time since 2007 and just the seventh time since 1950, has won three consecutive games for the first time since the 2010 season.

UK overcame a slow start to eclipse 45 points for the third time in 2014, the most since 2010. All but three of those points came after Kentucky spotted ULM a 14-3 advantage in the first quarter.

The UK defense, which had two interceptions returned for touchdowns in a game for the first time since 1986, held the Warhawks to 187 yards passing and just 77 yards on the ground. ULM was forced to punt eight times and fumbled five times, one which Kentucky recovered.

Offensively, quarterback Patrick Towles was 16-of-28 for 216 yards and three touchdowns. Javess Blue caught three passes for 109 yards and two scores, while Blake Bone caught two for one touchdown. Towles' 83-yard touchdown pass to Blue was a career long for the sophomore quarterback.

On the ground, Stanley Williams rushed seven times for 104 yards and one touchdown, a 58-yarder in the third quarter. He also opened the game with a 75-yard kickoff return to set up UK's first score of the game.

Kentucky entered the second quarter trailing 14-3, but after the UK defense forced ULM to punt with just over five minutes remaining in the quarter the Wildcats quickly began to cut away at the deficit. Towles hit Blue for an 83-yard touchdown pass, the longest play of the season for Kentucky, to bring UK within four.

On the very next ULM drive, Josh Forrest returned an interception 29 yards to give UK a 17-14 lead. The pick-six marked the second time in as many weeks the Wildcat defense returned the game-winning score for a touchdown.

On the game's opening drive, Austin MacGinnis hit a 37-yard field goal to give UK a 3-0 lead, the third time in six games in 2014 that Kentucky has scored on its first drive of the contest.

Following Forrest's pick-six that resulted in the go-ahead score, the UK defense forced ULM into a three-and-out, and six plays later, Blake Bone caught a four-yard touchdown pass from Towles to give UK a 24-14 lead. Boone's second touchdown catch of the season with 4:08 left in the half capped a six play, 44-yard drive.

On Kentucky's second drive of the second half, after the UK defense forced ULM into back-to-back three-and-outs, Blue hauled in a 21-yard pass from Towles for the score to give the Wildcats a 31-14 lead. The touchdown catch, Blue's second of the game, capped a four-play, 30-yard drive.

ULM's next drive resulted in another interception for the Wildcat defense. Marcus McWilson, with the 36-yard interception returned for a touchdown, gave UK a 38-14 lead and its fourth defensive score of the season. It marked the first time since 2008 that UK returned two turnovers for touchdowns, while the four defensive touchdowns was also the most since 2008.

LSU

Sources:

Facing arguably its toughest test of the season, the Kentucky football team suffered a 41-3 loss to LSU Saturday night in front of 101,581 at Tiger Stadium.

The Wildcats (5-2, 2-2 Southeastern Conference) were held to 217 yards offensively, with 146 coming through the air and 71 rushing yards. The Tigers (6-2, 2-2 SEC) had 423 total yards, including 303 on the ground and 120 passing.

Kentucky returns home Saturday, where it is a perfect 5-0 in 2014, to face No. 1 Mississippi State Saturday at 3:30 p.m. ET. The Wildcats will look to become bowl eligible with their sixth win of the season for the first time since 2010. UK's matchup with the top-ranked Bulldogs will air live on CBS and on the UK Radio Network.

UK quarterback Patrick Towles was 19-36 for 146 yards in addition to 16 yards rushing on seven attempts. Demarco Robinson caught three passes for 52 yards, including one for 33 yards, while Ryan Timmons had four catches for 24 yards.

On the ground, Mikel Horton led Kentucky with 29 yards while Stanley Boom Williams had seven rushes for 19 yards.

Defensively, three Wildcats had 10 tackles apiece. Marcus McWilson had an interception, his third pick of the season, along with a career-best 10 tackles. Za'Darius Smith added a sack.

LSU's offensive production was led by Terrence Magee, who ran for 127 yards and two touchdowns in addition to hauling in three passes for 44 yards. Quarterback Anthony Jennings was 7-14 for 120 yards and one touchdown.

The Tigers' Tre'Davious White also returned a 67-yard punt for a touchdown in the first quarter.

Kentucky got on the board with 1:15 left in the first quarter on an Austin MacGinnis 33-yard field goal to cut LSU's lead to 17-3. The score capped a 13-play, 66-yard drive for the Wildcat offense.

LSU scored on the game's opening drive to give the Tigers an early 7-0 lead. The touchdown marked just the second time this season that UK has allowed a game-opening touchdown drive by its opponent.

After the Tigers scored on their opening drive, they proceeded to score on their next two drives as well, with a field goal and a touchdown to lead 17-0. After UK's field goal to cut the deficit to 14, LSU was stopped on its three drives before scoring 10 points in the final minute to go ahead 27-3 at the half.

The halftime deficit was the first time this season UK has trailed after 30 minutes.

The Tigers scored two touchdowns in the third quarter, both Magee runs, for the final scores of the contest.

Mississippi State

Sources:

A career-outing by sophomore quarterback Patrick Towles was not enough for Kentucky to pull off an upset of visiting No. 1 Mississippi State on Saturday night in front of a season-high 64,791 rabid fans in Commonwealth Stadium. Towles' career-high numbers included touchdowns (4), passing yards (390), and rushing yards (76) in the first meeting at home against a No. 1 foe since UK upset LSU in three-overtimes in 2007.

Towles was 24-of-43 for 390 yards with two touchdowns through the air, while connecting with nine different receivers. The Ft. Thomas, Ky., native logged 76 yards on 23 attempts and a pair of scores on the ground which included a career-long rush of 48 yards in the third quarter. Towles accounted for four plays of more than 40 yards including a pair of touchdown tosses that went for 58 yards or longer.

Senior Alvin "Bud" Dupree led the defensive charge with 10 total tackles. He accounted for 1.5 tackles for a loss including a sack in the second quarter. Dupree is six sacks shy of becoming UK's all-time career leader in that category. He also had a team-high two quarterback hurries.

The Bulldogs were led by quarterback Dak Prescott who passed for 216 yards and a touchdown. He added 88 rushing yards and a pair of scores. Running back Josh Robinson rushed for 198 yards and two touchdowns.

After Mississippi State drove 82-yards for a touchdown on its first possession, the Wildcats utilized a five-play 78-yard drive to counter the No. 1 team in the country. Towles found senior Demarco Robinson on a curl route to the sidelines, and he tip-toed the sideline before racing 67 yards for the score. The touchdown haul was the first of the year for Robinson and the third of his career.

Kentucky's defense forced a three-and-out on the Bulldogs' next drive, but suffered a fumble at its own 19-yard line on its second play giving the ball back to State.  UK's defense limited the Bulldogs to a 26-yard field goal giving the visitors a 10-7 lead with 2:41 remaining in the opening quarter.

Mississippi State started the second quarter by going 68 yards over 10 plays capped by a two-yard plunge by Prescott to lift the Bulldogs to a 17-7 advantage. Kentucky answered with a 12-play, 58-yard drive of its own which ended in a 34-yard field goal by freshman Austin MacGinnis.

With the Bulldogs driving late in the half, Dupree applied pressure to Prescott forcing a tipped pass that was intercepted by Josh Forrest with under a minute to play in the half. It was the third interception of the season by UK's middle linebacker. UK drove to State's 40-yard line and attempted a 50-yard field goal to end the half, but it missed wide right.

Mississippi State began the second half with an 11-play, 75-yard scoring drive to take a 24-10 lead. Prescott scampered 12-yards for the score, his second rushing TD of the game.

The Wildcats answered with an eight-play, 86-yard scoring drive. A career-long 48-yard dash by Towles highlighted the drive. The QB scurried for a 10-yard score on third down to make it 24-17 in favor of the visitors with 8:33 remaining in the third quarter. It marked the third time in Towles' career that he rushed and threw for at least one touchdown.

Missouri

Sources:

The Kentucky football team's late-game comeback fell two scores short in a 20-10 loss at Missouri Saturday afternoon at Faurot Field.

Kentucky's touchdown came with 7:18 left in the game following a Missouri field goal. The Wildcats' 12-play, 8-yard drive was capped by a Javess Blue 1-yard touchdown pass from sophomore Patrick Towles. The score cut UK's deficit to 10 at 20-10.

The Kentucky defense held Missouri to 320 total yards. Junior linebacker Josh Forrest forced his first career fumble and led UK with 10 tackles and two tackles for loss. Senior DE/LB Alvin "Bud" Dupree finished with five tackles, a career-high 2.5 tackles and 1.5 sacks.

Offensively, Towles was 19-37 for 158 yards with one touchdown and an interception. Towles hit freshman Stanley "Boom" Williams five times for 58 yards, including a long of 32 yards. Freshman Mikel Horton led UK on the ground with 62 yards on 10 attempts.

After both teams punted twice to open the game, Missouri got on the board first with a 3-yard touchdown pass with 12:56 left in the second quarter. On the following drive, freshman Austin MacGinnis hit a 47-yard field goal to cap a four-play, 45-yard drive.

Mizzou answered on its next drive with another touchdown, a 26-yard pass from quarterback Bud Sasser, to take a 14-3 lead. The Tigers got on the board again late in the third quarter with a 41-yard field goal before another field goal with 7:23 left in the fourth quarter to make it 20-3.

Georgia
Sources:

The Kentucky football team was unable to overcome an early 21-0 deficit in a 63-31 loss to No. 17 Georgia in UK's final home contest Commonwealth Stadium of the 2014 season.

The Wildcats trailed the Bulldogs 21-0 just 10 minutes into the game, but quickly rallied back to score 24 second-quarter points to trail 35-24 at halftime. Georgia scored four unanswered touchdowns in the second half to extend its lead and clinch the verdict. UK second-quarter spurt began with a three-yard touchdown run by Braylon Heard. Heard's rush capped a 16-play, 74-yard drive that took 6:15, UK's longest scoring drive of the year in number of plays and time of possession. On the ensuing kickoff, Georgia could not gain control of the ball, and UK's J.D. Harmon recovered to give the Wildcats possession on UGA's 23-yard line. Eight plays later, Austin MacGinnis hit a 38-yard field goal.

The Bulldogs scored a touchdown on their next drive, but the Wildcats answered. On
the third play of the drive, Stanley "Boom" Williams found a hole and ran for a 56-yard touchdown. Williams finished the day with exactly 100 rushing yards, his second game of the season at the century mark. UK's next possession featured a 13-play, 75-yard touchdown drive capped by a 1-yard quarterback sneak by Patrick Towles. On the day, Towles passes for 139 yards, including a 9-yard TD to Javess Blue in the fourth quarter, and the UK QB also rushed for 60 net yards.

Georgia quarterback Hutson Mason threw for 174 yards and four touchdowns while
tailback Nick Chubb led all rushers with 170 yards and a TD. Isaiah McKenzie returned a kickoff and a punt for touchdowns.

Tennessee

Louisville

Postseason awards and further accomplishments

Associated Press All-SEC

Coaches All-SEC

AP All-America
 All-America First Team: 
 All-America Second Team: 
 All-America Third Team:

First round draft picks

Team statistics

References

Kentucky
Kentucky Wildcats football seasons
Kentucky Wildcats football